Midhope Castle is a 16th-century tower house in Scotland. It is situated in the hamlet of Abercorn on the Hopetoun estate, About  to the west of South Queensferry, on the outskirts of Edinburgh. It is a Category A listed building.

History
The derelict chateau that can be seen today represents the much-altered 5-storey, oblong tower house.

In the 15th-century Midhope belonged to the Martin family. During the latter 16th century, the castle belonged to Alexander Drummond of Midhope, brother to Robert Drummond of Carnock, Master of Work to the Crown of Scotland. A stone inscribed "AD 1582 MB" commemorates Alexander and his wife Marjory Bruce, daughter of Robert Bruce of Airth.

Alexander Drummond was a servant of the Earl of Huntly. On 7 August 1573, on behalf of the Earl of Huntly, Drummond returned jewels belonging to Mary, Queen of Scots to Regent Morton at Holyrood Palace. Drummond was buried at Airth Old Kirk.

A painted ceiling from the tower survives in the care of Historic Scotland at Edinburgh; it is planned to be put on public display at the Palace of Holyroodhouse. It includes cinquefoil motifs and probably commemorates the marriage of Sir Robert Drummond, who became laird in 1619, to a Hamilton heiress. The family motto was "ad astra per ardua" and fragments from another painted ceiling had gold stars on a blue blackgound, represented in the crest of the coat of arms.

In 1678, Midhope was given a facelift when an entrance tower was removed and the extension to the east was heightened and extended.

In popular culture

Midhope Castle is featured as a location in the Outlander TV series on Starz as the main character's, Jamie Fraser, family home called Lallybroch but also known as Broch Tuarach.

Photographs

Notes

References 
Mike Salter, (1985). Discovering Scottish Castles. Shire Publications Ltd. .
Royal Commission on the Ancient and Historical Monuments of Scotland (RCAHMS), NMRS Number: NT07NE 5.00 
 Photos of Midhope Castle
 Hopetoun Estate (Midhope Castle)

Houses completed in the 16th century
Ruins in West Lothian
Category A listed buildings in West Lothian
Listed castles in Scotland
Scheduled Ancient Monuments in West Lothian
Castles in West Lothian
Tower houses in Scotland